The Muddy River is a  river in Topsham, Maine, which empties into Merrymeeting Bay. The river is known to be very muddy.

See also
List of rivers of Maine

References

Maine Streamflow Data from the USGS
Maine Watershed Data From Environmental Protection Agency

Tributaries of the Kennebec River
Rivers of Sagadahoc County, Maine
Topsham, Maine
Rivers of Maine